Nicholas Sadler (born 1967) is an American actor.

Early life and career
Born in Minneapolis, Minnesota, he was raised in Apple Valley, Minnesota, where he attended Apple Valley High School. He was accepted into the Juilliard School's Drama Department while a senior in high school.

After graduating, he had roles in Stephen King's Sometimes They Come Back and as Mad Dog Coll in Mobsters. He has had major roles in films such as Disclosure, Twister, Scent of a Woman, and Hellraiser: Inferno.

In 1998 Nicholas Sadler wrote and directed the short film Jesus Tells A Joke. The film premiered at the Hamptons International Film Festival and went on to screen at festivals around the world, including Slamdance, Denver, and Deauville.

In 2002 Nicholas Sadler was the creative consultant for the Ray Romano documentary 95 Miles to Go, directed by Tom Caltabiano (Producer, Everybody Loves Raymond).

Personal life
Sadler has been married to his wife Gigi New since 2003. Together they have a son, named Cooper.

Filmography

Film and television

ABC Afterschool Specials (1989, TV Series) - Billy Dryer
The Cosby Show (1990, TV Series) - Thief
Sometimes They Come Back (1991, TV Movie) - Vinnie Vincent
Mobsters (1991) - Mad Dog Coll
Stop! Or My Mom Will Shoot (1992) - Suicide
Scent of a Woman (1992) - Harry Havemeyer
Acting on Impulse (1993) - Tommy
Disclosure (1994) - Don Cherry
Earth 2 (1995, TV Series) - Max
Sawbones (1995, TV Movie) - Brad Fraser
The Last Supper (1995) - Homeless Basher
Fallen Angels (1995, TV Series) - Al
Frank and Jesse (1995) - Arch Clements
The Method (1996) - Jack
Twister (1996) - Kubrick
Nightwatch (1997) - Theater Director (uncredited)
ER (1997, TV Series) - Ricky Melgato
Spoiler (1998) - Renny
Idle Hands (1999) - Ruck
Turkey. Cake. (1999, Short) - Rob
Good vs. Evil (1999–2000, TV Series) - Luis Rivera
Civilty (2000) - Joe McPhillips
Hellraiser: Inferno (2000) - Bernie
Desperate But Not Serious (2000) - Jonathan Gold
CSI: Crime Scene Investigation (2002, TV Series) - Dwight Kelso
Charmed (2003, TV Series) - Leech
In Justice (2006, TV Series) - Larry Duffy
Men of a Certain Age (2010, TV Series) - Repairman
Fair Game (2010) - CIA Tour Leader
True Grit (2010) - Repentant Condemned Man
Harold's Bad Day (2012, Short) - Marty
The Bye Bye Man (2017) - Professor Cooper
Paterno (2018, TV Movie) - Todd

Production credits
Jesus Takes a Joke (1998) (director, writer and producer)
95 Miles to Go (2002) (creative consult)

References

External links

Living people
Male actors from Minneapolis
People from Apple Valley, Minnesota
1967 births